The Colora Meetinghouse is a historic Friends (or Quaker) meeting house located at Colora, Cecil County, Maryland, United States.

The meeting house was built in 1841 as part of a larger dispute known as the "great separation." The original members of the Colora Meeting, then called the Nottingham Preparative Meeting, sided with the orthodox Friends splitting off from the Hicksite West Nottingham Friends Meeting. The new meeting was first part of Baltimore Yearly Meeting. In 1854 it formed the Primitive Yearly Meeting with several nearby meetings and in 1890 became part of the Western Quarterly Meeting.

Architecture
It is six bays wide and one room deep, and measures 36 feet by 22 feet, in the traditional plan with separate entrances for the men and women and a sliding divider to separate the interior into two areas for business meetings.  Its walls are constructed of  stuccoed fieldstone, with a wooden box cornice. The building features two interior end chimneys protruding through a slate roof. The property includes a small cemetery and a two-story building built in 1869, and used as a Friends schoolhouse until 1890 when public schools were built.

The Colora Meetinghouse was listed on the National Register of Historic Places in 1977. It is open for worship once yearly, generally at 2:00 pm on the third Sunday of September.

References

External links
, including undated photo, at Maryland Historical Trust

Quaker meeting houses in Maryland
Churches in Cecil County, Maryland
Churches on the National Register of Historic Places in Maryland
Churches completed in 1841
National Register of Historic Places in Cecil County, Maryland